Heaven is the second full-length record by Mobius Band. It was released in 2007.

Critical reception

Track listing
"Hallie"– 4:27
"Secret Language" – 3:51
"A Hint Of Blood" – 3:36
"Leave The Keys In The Door" – 4:05
"Friends Like These" – 4:14
"Control" – 4:39
"Tie A Tie" – 4:03
"Under Sand" – 3:51
"Black Spot" – 4:49
"I Am Always Waiting" – 4:24

References

2007 albums